Eublemma sperans is a species of moth of the family Erebidae. It is found in South Africa.

References

Endemic moths of South Africa
Boletobiinae
Moths described in 1874